Fanjul or Franjul might refer to:

Alfonso Fanjul Sr. (1909-1980), Cuban sugar baron, father of the Fanjul brothers
The Fanjul Brothers, sugar company owners residing in Palm Beach, Florida
The Franjul Family, a prominent Dominican Republic Family